Sprinkler may refer to:

 Irrigation sprinkler, a device for watering lawns or crops
 Fire sprinkler, a device for fire suppression
 Sprinkler (dance), a dance move

See also

 Feynman sprinkler, an experimental device and problem of physics
 Holy water sprinkler (disambiguation)
 Sprinkler strategy, a market entry strategy in business